The National Assembly of the Batavian Republic (Dutch: Nationale Vergadering) was the Dutch parliament between 1796 and 1798. The National Assembly was founded in 1796 after general elections. It replaced the States-General of the Batavian Republic. The President of the National Assembly was head of state of the Batavian Republic between 1796 and 1798, during his term in office (usually just half a month).

A number of members of the second National Assembly (elected in 1797) were expelled after a [[coup d'état]] by Pieter Vreede on 25 January 1798 aided by General Daendels. This rump Assembly was itself dissolved after a second coup on 12 June 1798, again supported by Daendels.

A new parliament under the name Representative Body (Vertegenwoordigend Lichaam) came into being in May 1798 after elections held under a new constitution. Under that new constitution, the head of state of the Batavian Republic was a member of the Uitvoerend Bewind. Following the June 1798 coup, the name changed to Intermediary Legislative Body (Intermediair Wetgevend Lichaam), but it was changed back to Representative Body a month later. In 1801 it was replaced with a new 35-member parliament named the Legislative Body (Wetgevend Lichaam'').

Presidents of the National Assembly between 1796 and 1798
Pieter Paulus 1 March 1796 – 17 March 1796
Pieter Leonard van de Kasteele 18 March 1796 – 1 April 1796
Albert Johan de Sitter 1 April 1796 – 17 April 1796
Jan Bernd Bicker 17 April 1796 – 3 May 1796
Daniël Cornelis de Leeuw 3 May 1796 – 17 May 1796
Rutger Jan Schimmelpenninck 17 May 1796 – 30 May 1796
Joan Arend de Vos van Steenwijk 30 May 1796 – 13 June 1796
Jacob George Hieronymus Hahn 13 June 1796 – 27 June 1796
Paulus Hartog 27 June 1796 – 11 July 1796
Willem Aernout de Beveren 11 July 1796 – 25 July 1796
Ludovicus Timon de Kempenaer 25 July 1796 – 8 August 1796
Jan Pieter van Wickevoort Crommelin 8 August 1796 – 22 August 1796
Paulus Emmanuel Anthonie de la Court 22 August 1796 – 5 September 1796
Jacob Jan Cambier 5 September 1796 – 19 September 1796
Jacobus Kantelaar 19 September 1796 – 3 October 1796
Tammo Adriaan ten Berge 3 October 1796 – 17 October 1796
Bernardus Blok 17 October 1796 – 31 October 1796
Gerrit David Jordens 31 October 1796 – 14 November 1796
Abraham Gijsbertus Verster 14 November 1796 – 28 November 1796
IJsbrand van Hamelsveld 28 November 1796 – 12 December 1796
Cornelis van Lennep 12 December 1796 – 26 December 1796
Jan Hendrik Stoffenberg 26 December 1796 – 9 January 1797
Lambert Engelbert van Eck 9 January 1797 – 23 January 1797
Willem Queysen 23 January 1797 – 6 February 1797
Carel de Vos van Steenwijk 6 February 1797 – 20 February 1797
Hendrik van Castrop 20 February 1797 – 6 March 1797
Meinardus Siderius 6 March 1797 – 20 March 1797
Cornelis Wilhelmus de Rhoer 20 March 1797 – 3 April 1797
Jan Couperus 3 April 1797 – 17 April 1797
Jacob Abraham de Mist 17 April 1797 – 1 May 1797
Jan Bernd Bicker 1 May 1797 – 15 May 1797
Rutger Jan Schimmelpenninck 15 May 1797 – 29 May 1797
Gerard Willem van Marle 29 May 1797 – 12 June 1797
Herman Hendrik Vitringa 12 June 1797 – 26 June 1797 
Johan Herman de Lange 26 June 1797 – 10 July 1797
Ambrosius Justus Zubli 10 July 1797 – 24 July 1797
Willem Hendrik Teding van Berkhout 24 July 1797 – 7 August 1797
Scato Trip 7 August 1797 – 21 August 1797
Pieter Leonard van de Kasteele 21 August 1797 – 1 September 1797
Jan David Pasteur 1 September 1797 – 18 September 1797
Adrianus Ploos van Amstel 18 September 1797 – 2 October 1797
Joachim Nuhout van der Veen 2 October 1797 – 16 October 1797
Hugo Gevers 16 October 1797 – 30 October 1797
Jacob van Manen 30 October 1797 – 13 November 1797
Pieter Vreede 13 November 1797 – 27 November 1797
Stefanus Jacobus van Langen 27 November 1797 – 11 December 1797
 11 December 1797 – 25 December 1797
Joan Bernard Auffmorth 25 December 1797 – 8 January 1798 
Joannes Franciscus Rudolphus van Hooff 8 January 1798 – 19 January 1798
Johannes Henricus Midderigh 19 January 1798 – 25 January 1798

Defunct national legislatures
Political history of the Batavian Republic
1796 establishments in the Batavian Republic
1801 disestablishments in the Batavian Republic